Bernard Lafferty (14 April 1945 – 4 November 1996) was an Irish butler and heir to American tobacco heiress and philanthropist, Doris Duke. Duke hired Lafferty in 1987 and named him the executor of her $1.2 billion estate six months prior to her death in October 1993. Their unorthodox relationship sparked controversy and speculation, although no charges were ever filed against Lafferty regarding her death.

Early life 
Bernard Lafferty was born on April 14, 1945, in Creeslough, County Donegal, Ireland. He was the only child of Edward Lafferty (1901-1964) and Angela McCalliog (1915-1965). He was a first cousin of Scottish former footballer Jim McCalliog. He moved to Glasgow, Scotland, with his mother shortly after his father's death in September 1964. Lafferty was orphaned at 20 years old when his mother was hit by a motorcycle the following August.

Career and Doris Duke
Lafferty emigrated to the United States to live with his aunt in Philadelphia around 1980. Lafferty became the maître d' at The Bellevue-Stratford Hotel. He befriended many famous and influential people during his tenure, including Sophia Loren, Elizabeth Taylor and Peggy Lee.

Duke made Lafferty the executor of her estate six months before she died in 1993. After Duke's death, Lafferty managed her many philanthropic endeavors as directed in her will. Lafferty relinquished control as co-executor of the Duke estate in a 1995 settlement with Duke's disinherited adopted daughter.

Death 
Lafferty purchased a $2.5 million mansion in Bel Air, where he resided until he died, three years later in his sleep of a heart attack in 1996. As specified in his will, Lafferty's ashes were scattered off Hawaii, where he had previously scattered Duke's ashes.

In popular culture
In 1999, Lafferty was portrayed by Richard Chamberlain in a four-part television miniseries titled, Too Rich: The Secret Life of Doris Duke.

In 2007, HBO Films produced a semi-fictional film about Duke and Lafferty in a movie titled Bernard and Doris, starring Susan Sarandon and Ralph Fiennes.

References 

American butlers
People from County Donegal
American tobacco industry executives
People from Hillsborough Township, New Jersey
1945 births
1996 deaths
Irish emigrants to the United States
People from Beverly Hills, California
20th-century American philanthropists